Myrmeleontini is an antlion tribe in the subfamily Myrmeleontinae.

Genera
 Afroleon
 Baliga
 Bordus
 Callistoleon
 Cocius
 Congoleon
 Dictyoleon
 Euroleon
 Formicaleo
 Hagenomyia
 Kirghisoleon
 Macroleon
 Megistoleon
 Myrmeleon
 Porrerus
 Talosus
 Weeleus

References

External links

Myrmeleontinae
Insect tribes